Hicksville is the only release by the musical project Celtic Cross.

Track listing
Hicksville  – 7:35
Featuring Matt Coldrick from Green Nuns of the Revolution
Stargate Avalon  – 1:32
Jade Garden  – 7:38
Shwazz  – 8:59
Fifth Level  – 4:36
Khatmandu  – 7:43
Mundis Imaginalus  – 7:50
Louden  – 3:22
Darshannon  – 6:10
Featuring Chester, half of the duo "Baba G" with Hallucinogen

1998 debut albums
Celtic Cross (band) albums